Goshen is an unincorporated community in Lincoln County, in the U.S. state of Georgia.

History
A post office called Goshen was established in 1808, and remained in operation until 1903. The community derives its name from the Land of Goshen.

References

Unincorporated communities in Lincoln County, Georgia
Unincorporated communities in Georgia (U.S. state)